The Columbus Public Library is a Carnegie library in Columbus, Wisconsin. The library was built in 1912 after the Columbus Women's Civic Club convinced the Carnegie Foundation to sponsor a building for the community's library program. Claude and Starck, a Madison architectural firm known for designing libraries, planned the Prairie School building. The library is still in operation; in addition to library services, the building also held Women's Civic Club meetings and various other community meetings. On November 15, 1990, the library was added to the National Register of Historic Places.

Gallery

References

External links
Columbus Public Library

Library buildings completed in 1912
Libraries on the National Register of Historic Places in Wisconsin
Prairie School architecture in Wisconsin
Buildings and structures in Columbia County, Wisconsin
Carnegie libraries in Wisconsin
Columbus, Wisconsin
1912 establishments in Wisconsin
National Register of Historic Places in Columbia County, Wisconsin